The Confédération Mondiale des Sports de Boules (CMSB) is the international organization, recognized by the International Olympic Committee, which governs the sport of the boules.

History
The CMSB – Confédération Mondiale des Sports de Boules – was created (on 21 December 1985 in Monaco) by three international boules organizations
 CBI Confederazione Boccistica Internazionale (bocce)
 FIB Fédération Internationale de Boules (Sport-boules)
 FIPJP Fédération Internationale de Pétanque et Jeu Provençal (pétanque and jeu provençal)
for the purpose of lobbying the Olympic committee to make boules sports part of the summer Olympics. World Bowls (bowls) was also a member from 2003 until 2013.

Boules and the CMSB were granted consideration for entry to the Olympic Games on 15 October 1986, but have never been granted the status of an official Olympic sport. Nevertheless, every year the CMSB continues to re-present its application.

Recognition
The CMSB is a sports federation recognized by the following confederations.

International Olympic Committee (IOC)
Association of the IOC Recognised International Sports Federations (ARISF)
SportAccord (GAISF)

See also
 Boules at the Summer Olympics
 Boules sports at the World Games

References

External links
 Official site

Boules
Boules
Sports organisations of Monaco